Qeshlaq-e Shomali Rural District was formerly in the Central District of Parsabad County, Ardabil province, Iran. At the 2006 census, its population was 23,821 in 5,115 households. The following census of 2011 counted 24,296 inhabitants living in 6,179 households. The largest of its 79 villages was Owltan, with 3,991 people (now in Owltan Rural District). By the time of the most recent census of 2016, the rural district had been divided into Owltan Rural District (which remained in the Central District) and the newly formed Eslamabad District containing two rural districts.

References 

Parsabad County

Rural Districts of Ardabil Province

Populated places in Ardabil Province

Populated places in Parsabad County